Pushoytamen (Russian, Tajik, and Yaghnobi Пушойтамен) is an abandoned village in Sughd Region, western Tajikistan. It is part of the jamoat Anzob in the Ayni District.

Notes

Populated places in Sughd Region
Yaghnob